The Holy Rosary Historic District in Kansas City, Missouri is a  area of the Columbus Park neighborhood centering on the Holy Rosary Church built in 1898. It was listed on the National Register of Historic Places in 2007.

References

Gothic Revival architecture in Missouri
Geography of Kansas City, Missouri
Historic districts on the National Register of Historic Places in Missouri
National Register of Historic Places in Kansas City, Missouri